Rineloricaria langei is a species of catfish in the family Loricariidae. It is native to South America, where it occurs in the Iraí River, which is a tributary of the Iguazu River in the state of Paraná in Brazil. It is typically found in small streams with slow to moderate flow and a substrate composed primarily of sand, although rocks and organic debris are also usually present. The species reaches 11.7 cm (4.6 inches) in standard length and is believed to be a facultative air-breather.

References 

Fish described in 2008
Catfish of South America
Fish of Brazil
Loricariini